Poigai Alvar was one of the twelve Alvar saints of South India, who are known for their affiliation to Vaishnava tradition of Hinduism. The verses of Alvars are compiled as Nalayira Divya Prabandham and the 108 temples revered are classified as Divya Desam. Poigai is one of the three principal Alvars, with the other two being Bhoothath Alvar and Peyalvar, collectively called Mutalamalvargal, who are regarded to be born out of divinity. Poigai composed hundred verses that are classified as Mutal Tiruvantati, and his composition is set in the antati style, in which the ending syllable is the starting one for the next verse.

According to traditional account, the first three Alvars belong to Dvapara Yuga (before 4200 BCE). As per Hindu legend, Poigai was found in a small pond near the Yadhotakaari temple at Tiruvekkaa. In Tamil, small pond is called poigai, and since he was found in a pond, he got the name Poigai.

As per legend, the three Alvars were once confined in a small dark enclosure during a rain in Thirukovilur and they experienced a fourth individual among them. They found out that it was god Vishnu and Poigai Alvar wished to see his face continuously but could view only from the simmering light of the lightning. With a view to maintain the continuity of light, he instantly composed hundred songs wishing light to emerge. The other two continued composing hundred songs each on Vishnu. The works of these earliest saints contributed to the philosophical and theological ideas of Vaishnavism. Along with the three Shaiva Nayanmars, they influenced the ruling Pallava kings of the South Indian region, resulting in changing the religious geography from Buddhism and Jainism to the two sects of Hinduism.

Alvars

The word Alvar means the 'immersed', referring to the poet-saints's deep devotion to their supreme deity, Vishnu. The Alvars are considered the twelve supreme devotees of Vishnu in Sri Vaishnavism, who were instrumental in popularising Vaishnavism during the 5th to 8th centuries CE. The religious works of these saints in Tamil, songs of love and devotion, are compiled as Naalayira Divya Prabandham, containing 4000 verses, with each of the 108 temples revered in their songs is classified as a Divya Desam. The saints had different origins, and belonged to different classes. According to tradition, the first three Alvars, Poigai, Bhoothath, and Pei, were born miraculously. Thirumalisai was the son of a sage, Thondaradi, Mathurakavi, Periya, and Andal were from Brahmin varna, Kulasekhara from the Kshatriya varna, Namm from a cultivator family, Tirupana from the Tamil Panar community, and Tirumangai from the Kalvar community.

Divya Suri Saritra by Garuda-Vahana Pandita (11th century CE), Guruparamparaprabavam by Pinbaragiya Perumal Jiyar, Periya tiru mudi adaivu by Anbillai Kandadiappan, Yatindra Pranava Prabavam by Pillai Lokacharya, commentaries on Divya Prabandam, Guru Parampara (lineage of Gurus) texts, temple records and inscriptions give a detailed account of the Alvars and their works. According to these texts, the saints were considered incarnations of some form of Vishnu. Poigai is considered an incarnation of Panchajanya (Krishna's conch), Bhoothath of Kaumodaki (Vishnu's mace), Pey of Nandaka (Vishnu's sword), Thirumalisai of Sudarshanam (Vishnu's discus), Namm of Vishvaksena (Vishnu's commander), Madhurakavi of Vainatheya (Vishnu's eagle, Garuda), Kulasekhara of Kaustubha (Vishnu's necklace), Periya of Garuda (Vishnu's eagle), Andal of Bhudevi (Vishnu's wife, Lakshmi, in her aspect as Bhudevi), Thondaradippodi of Vaijayanti/Vanamalai (Vishnu's garland), Thiruppaan of Srivatsa (An auspicious mark on Vishnu's chest) and Thirumangai of Sharanga (Rama's bow). The songs of Prabandam are regularly sung in several the Vishnu temples of South India daily and also during festivals.

According to traditional account by Manavala Mamunigal, the first three Alvars, namely, Poigai, Bhoothath and Pey belong to Dvapara Yuga (before 4200 BCE). It is widely accepted by tradition and historians that the trio are the earliest among the twelve Alvars. Along with the three Saiva nayanmars, they influenced the ruling Pallava kings, creating a Bhakti movement that resulted in changing the religious geography from Buddhism and Jainism to these two sects of Hinduism in the region. The Alvars were also instrumental in promoting the Bhagavata cult and the two epics of India, namely, Ramayana and Mahabharata. The Alvars were instrumental in spreading Vaishnavism throughout the region. The verses of the various Alvars were compiled by Nathamuni (824-924 CE), a 10th-century Vaishnava theologian, who called it the "Tamil Veda".

Early life

Poigai was found in a small pond near the Yadhotakaari temple at Tiruvekkaa.  In Tamil, a small pond is called a poigai, and since he was found in a pond, he got the name Poigai. At Kanchipuram there is a temple inside the Deva-sarovara lake. This temple enshrines an idol of Saroyogi in a recumbent posture with eyes closed in meditation. From childhood, Poigai was deeply devoted to Vishnu. He mastered all the Vaishnava speeches, and followed the Vaishnava tradition. He was variously known as Ayonigi, Saro-yogi, Kasara-yogi, Poigai-piraan, Saravora Munindra and Padma-muni.

Composition

As per Hindu legend, Vishnu appeared to the Mutal Alvars (first three Alvars) at Thirukkoilur. It was day time, but it darkened and started raining heavily. The wandering Poigai Alvar found out a small hide out, which has a space for one person to lie down. Bhoothath Alvar arrived there looking for a hiding place and Poigai Alvar accommodated him, with both sitting together. In the meanwhile, Pei Alvar also came to the same place as all the three preferred to stand because of lack of space. The darkness became dense and inside the small room, they were not able to see each other. In the meanwhile, they felt a fourth person also forced his way among them. The three Alvars realised from the light of the lightning that the fourth one had a charming face that was sublime and divine. The trio could immediately realize that it was Vishnu who was huddling among them. Poigai Alvar wished to see Vishnu's face continuously, but could view only from the simmering light of the lightning. With a view to maintain the continuity of light, he instantly composed hundred songs wishing the earth to be a big pot full of ghee like an ocean where the sun could be the burning wick.
 

The song is also interpreted as the Alvar praying to god to remove the darkness and ask for his unlimited knowledge and power. Bhoothath Alvar also sang 100 songs imagining to light the lamp constantly through ardent love for him. Peyalvar sang another 100 songs, where he described the enchanting charm of the divine face and the association of Narayana equipped with chakra and sankha, and his divine consort, the goddess Lakshmi.

Poigai composed hundred verses that are classified as the Mutal Tiruvantati. Poigai's composition was set in the antati style. The word anta means end, and adi means beginning. The antati style has ending word or the syllable of each verse as the beginning word of the succeeding verse and the last word of the hundredth verse becomes the beginning of the first verse, making the hundred verses a true garland of verses. The works of these earliest saints contributed to the philosophical and theological ideas of Vaishnavism. The verses of the trio speak of Narayana (another name for Vishnu) as the supreme deity and they refer frequently to Trivikrama and Krishna, the avatars of Vishnu.

Worship
There is a shrine dedicated to Poigai in the Yathothkari Perumal Temple tank called Deva Sarovaram where his image is depicted in reclining posture. Poigai has revered Sri Ranganathaswamy Temple in one, Thirupaarkadal in one, Tirumala Venkateswara Temple in ten, Thiruvikrama Perumal Temple in two, Vaikuntha in two and Tiruvekkaa in four verses. Alvar Utsavam is a festival celebrated annually during the birth date of the saint based on Tamil calendar in the Yathothkariswami temple at Tiruvekka.

Mangalasasanam
There are 20 of his pasurams in the Naalayira Divya Prabhandham. He has sung in praise of six temples.

Notes

References

External links

Alvars
Vaishnava saints
Tamil Hindu saints

te:ముదలాళ్వారులు